The 2014 European championships at international draughts for Men and Women were held 7–13 October 2014 in Tallinn in 9 rounds Swiss-system tournament. Roel Boomstra won the men's tournament, followed by Aynur Shaibakov and Arnaud Cordier, together with 5 other players, they scored 12 points. With the women, Olga Baltazhy won the title, followed by Tamara Tansykkuzhina and Zoja Golubeva, all three with 13 points.

Results men

Results women

External links 
 Website with results
 Full results men
 Full results women

2014 in draughts
European championships international draughts
2014 in Estonian sport
International sports competitions hosted by Estonia
Sports competitions in Tallinn
October 2014 sports events in Europe